Mount Jefferson is a mountain in Penobscot County in the U.S. state of Maine. The mountain is also known as Jefferson Mountain.

References

Mountains of Penobscot County, Maine
Mountains of Maine